Hydroterskite is a rare zirconium silicate mineral, related to terskite (hence its name), with the formula Na2ZrSi6O12(OH)6. It was discovered in the Saint-Amable sill near Montréal, Québec, Canada. It is hydrous, when compared to terskite. Chemically similar minerals include litvinskite and kapustinite.

References

Silicate minerals
Zirconium minerals
Sodium minerals
Orthorhombic minerals